The Badener Sprint-Cup was a Group 3 flat horse race in Germany open to thoroughbreds aged three years or older. It was run at Baden-Baden over a distance of 1,400 metres (about 7 furlongs), and it was scheduled to take place each year in October.

History
The event was originally called the Grosser Sprint-Preis, and it used to be staged at Munich. It was established in 1985, and it was initially contested over 1,300 metres. For a period it held Listed status.

The Grosser Sprint-Preis was promoted to Group 3 level in 1998. It was transferred to Baden-Baden and renamed the Badener Sprint-Cup in 2004. From this point its distance was 1,400 metres.

The race was last run in 2009. It was replaced the following year by the Badener Ladies Sprint Cup, a Listed event for fillies and mares.

Records
Most successful horse (2 wins):
 Silicon Bavaria – 1990, 1991
 Tomba – 1998, 1999
 Soave – 2002, 2005

Leading jockey (2 wins):
 Peter Schiergen – Smaragd (1985), Macanal (1995)
 David Wildman – Brigantin (1986), Bannier (1992)
 Olivier Poirier – Allius (1988), Silicon Bavaria (1991)
 Bruce Raymond – Savahra Sound (1989), Silicon Bavaria (1990)
 Terence Hellier – Areias (2004), Chantilly Tiffany (2008)

Leading trainer (2 wins):
 Erich Pils – Brigantin (1986), Bannier (1992)
 Robert Collet – Silicon Bavaria (1990, 1991)
 Brian Meehan – Tomba (1998, 1999)
 Andreas Trybuhl – Soave (2002, 2005)

Winners

See also
 List of German flat horse races
 Recurring sporting events established in 1985 – this race is included under its original title, Grosser Sprint-Preis.

References

 Racing Post:

 galopp-sieger.de – Großer Sprint Preis.
 galopp-sieger.de – Badener Sprint-Cup.
 horseracingintfed.com – International Federation of Horseracing Authorities – Badener Sprint-Cup (2009).
 pedigreequery.com – Grosser Sprint-Preis – München-Riem.
 pedigreequery.com – Badener Sprint-Cup – Baden-Baden.

Open mile category horse races
Horse races in Germany
Discontinued horse races